Beires is a municipality of Almería province, in the autonomous community of Andalusia, Spain.

Demographics

References

External links
  Beires - Sistema de Información Multiterritorial de Andalucía
  Beires - Diputación Provincial de Almería
  Beires - Página diseñada por Raimundo del Rey Maeso 

Municipalities in the Province of Almería